The Pakistan Telecommunication Authority (PTA) is the telecommunication regulator of Pakistan, responsible for the establishment, operation and maintenance of telecommunication systems and the provision of telecommunication services in Pakistan. Headquartered in Islamabad, PTA also has regional offices located in Karachi, Lahore, Peshawar, Quetta, Muzaffarabad, Rawalpindi, Multan and Gilgit.

History 
The Pakistan Telecommunication Ordinance 1994, established the primary regulatory framework for the telecommunication industry including the establishment of an authority. Thereafter, Telecommunication (Re-Organization) Act no XVII was promulgated in 1996 that aimed to reorganize the telecom sector of Pakistan. Under Telecom Reorganization Act 1996, Pakistan Telecommunication Authority (PTA) was established in 1996 to regulate the establishment, operation and maintenance of telecommunication systems and the provision of telecom services.

Functions
To regulate the establishment, operation and maintenance of telecommunication systems and provision of telecommunication services in Pakistan. To receive and expeditiously dispose of applications for the use of radio-frequency spectrum.
To promote and protect the interests of users of telecommunication services in Pakistan. To promote the availability of a wide range of high quality, efficient, cost effective and competitive telecommunication services throughout Pakistan. To promote rapid modernization of telecommunication systems and telecommunication services. To investigate and adjudicate on complaints and other claims made against licensees arising out of alleged contraventions of the provisions of this Act, the rules made and licenses issued there under and take action accordingly. which led the government to publish a tax on the electronic device attached by the telecommunication service brought from overseas to Pakistan.
To make recommendations to the Federal Government on policies with respect to international telecommunications, provision of support for participation in international meetings and agreements to be executed in relation to the routing of international traffic and accounting settlements.

Responsibilities of Authority
In exercising its functions and powers under the Act, the authority ensures:
 Rights of licensees are duly protected.
 All of its decisions and determinations are made promptly, in an open equitable, non discriminatory, consistent and transparent manner.
 All applications made to it are disposed of expeditiously;
 The persons affected by its decisions or determination are given a due notice thereof and provided with an opportunity of being heard.
 It encourages, except subject to the exclusive right of the company in basic telephone service, fair competition in the telecommunication sector.
 The interest of users of telecommunication services are duly safeguarded and protected.
 Preventing unlawful online content.

Leadership 
The Authority consists of a Chairman, Member (Finance) and Member (Compliance & Enforcement).

Current 
Chairman PTA seat is currently vacant. as Major General (R) Amir Azeem Bajwa HI(M) relenquished the charge after completion of tenure.  Muhammad Naveed is Member (Finance) and Dr. Khawar Siddique Khokhar is Member (Compliance & Enforcement).

Licensing

NGMS Spectrum Auction 2004 
PTA conducted first spectrum auction in 2004, in which a total of 13.6 MHz spectrum in 900 and 1800 MHz was sold at US$582 Million. As a result of auction, Telenor and Warid Telecom entered Pakistan's telecom market.

NGMS Spectrum Auction 2014
PTA auctioned spectrum for 3G and 4G services in 2014. One 4G license and three 3G licenses were finally auctioned on 23 April 2014. The 4G license was bagged by Zong (as well as 10 MHz 3G license), while the 3G licenses were auctioned to Telenor (5 MHz), Mobilink (10 MHz) and Ufone (5 MHz). While Warid Pakistan was the only operator in Pakistan not to bid on the auction; Later on, Warid started LTE services using a previously acquired technology neutral license. The auction raised a total of $1.22 billion including 10% advance tax for the government of Pakistan.

NGMS Spectrum Auction 2016 
Another auction was held in June 20for a 10 MHz block in the 850 MHz (Band 5) frequency, the base price was set at USD 395 million. Telenor Pakistan was the only bidder in the auction and won the license for 850 MHz which it now uses for 3G (HSPA+) and LTE.

NGMS Spectrum Auction 2017 
PTA plans to hold another auction on 16 May 2017 to auction a 10 MHz block in the 1800 MHz (Band 3) frequency, which was un-sold in the 2014 NGMS auction.

The base price will be set at USD 295 million.

It was first mentioned that Ufone could've been the only operator to participate in the 2017 NGMS auction, however as of 24 April 2017, PTA officials had revealed that all telecom operators have shown great interest in the available spectrum and the auction has been delayed to 24 May 2017 on the request of all telecom operators.

Contrary to earlier rumours and statements, the only operator to bid for the 1800 MHz 4G spectrum in the 2017 auction would be Jazz, the other operators, Telenor, Zong and Ufone did not submit any applications and a statement from PTA mentioned that Jazz was the only operator to submit the application before the deadline which was 17 May 2017.

On 18 May 2017, Jazz became the winner of the 4G spectrum auction. It will be officially awarded the spectrum after the fee is paid.

NGMS Spectrum Auction 2021 
PTA held a spectrum auction in September 2021, for both 1800 MHz (Band 3) and 2100 MHz (Band 1). Only one network operator participated in the auction, Ufone (PTML) submitted a bid for 2x9 MHz in the 1800 MHz band which it won for USD $279 million.

NGMS Spectrum Auction 2021 (AJK & GB) 
A separate spectrum auction was held by PTA specifically for the Azad Jammu & Kashmir and Gilgit Baltistan regions for both 1800 MHz and 2100 MHz bands. Both Zong CMPak and Jazz (PMCL) participated in the auction for 2x10 MHz of 1800 MHz, however after 18 rounds, Zong was declared as the winner of the 10 MHz block. Telenor, Ufone and Zong also won an additional 1.2 MHz in the same band.

PTA stated that none of the operators except Telenor Pakistan decided to participate in the auction for 2100 MHz, so Telenor was awarded 2x15 MHz in the 2100 MHz band at the base price.

5G 
PTA has been struggling to release 5G internet in Pakistan for quite a while. Initially planned to release in 2022, 5G internet in Pakistan was delayed due to a number of different factors, the most primary of which were the devastating floods of 2022.

The 5G Launch was then delayed to June 2023 and is now finally scheduled to be released in July 2023. According to sources, 5G internet in Pakistan is expected to have a speed of around 1.685 giga bytes per second.

A speed over 1.5 gbps will be a major jump for both the consumers and mobile internet providers of Pakistan.

Blocked Content

PUBG Controversy 
In July 2020, PTA banned the online game PlayerUnknown's Battlegrounds Many social media activists like Waqar Zaka uploaded videos on YouTube urging Pakistanis to speak up against this ban. Millions of Social media users of Pakistan have flooded sites like Facebook, Twitter and have shown overwhelming support for PUBG (PlayerUnknown's Battlegrounds). In response, PTA lifted ban on the popular online game.

TikTok 
In October 2020, PTA blocked TikTok for failing to filter out "immoral and indecent" content. Soon after, TikTok made an agreement to moderate the content available in Pakistan and the ban was lifted.

In March 2021, PTA said that a court ordered to block TikTok due to complaints from "indecent" content.

Wikipedia 
The Pakistan Telecommunication Authority banned Wikipedia in the country due to "sacrilegious content" in February, 2023. Several days later, Prime Minister Shehbaz Sharif ordered the immediate restoration of access to the online encyclopaedia website, and established two cabinet committees to review the PTA's action and suggest alternative measures for removing or blocking access to objectionable content on Wikipedia and other online information sites.

References

External links
 PTA official website
 PTA Official facebook page
 Pakistan: Leader in providing regulatory services on-line
 "Pakistan v/s Google Products" Blogspot Down in Pakistan
 PTA bans use of DECT 6.0 cordless phones in Pakistan

1996 establishments in Pakistan
Government agencies established in 1996
Telecommunications regulatory authorities
Regulatory authorities of Pakistan